Travelin' On is an album by the jazz pianist Oscar Peterson and his trio, released in 1968. It was recorded during the same sessions as Mellow Mood. It was the sixth part of Peterson's Exclusively for My Friends series.

Music
The Oscar Peterson trio included Sam Jones on bass and Bobby Durham on drums. "Sax No End" had been recorded for the first time in 1967 by the Kenny Clarke/Francy Boland Big Band. The AllMusic review suggested that "one can almost hear a larger ensemble by listening to Peterson's virtuoso interpretation in an uptempo setting, assisted by Jones' agile bass and Durham's steady percussion".

Reception
The Penguin Guide to Jazz included the album in its selected "Core Collection".

Track listing
 "Travelin' On" (Traditional)
 "Emily" (Johnny Mandel, Johnny Mercer)
 "Quiet Nights" (Antonio Carlos Jobim, Gene Lees)
 "Sax No End" (Francis Boland)
 "When Lights Are Low" (Benny Carter, Spencer Williams)

Personnel
 Oscar Peterson – piano
 Sam Jones – double bass
 Bobby Durham – drums

References

External links
Jazz Discographies

1969 albums
Oscar Peterson albums
MPS Records albums